Pryce may refer to:

Surname:
David Pryce-Jones (born 1936), British author and commenter
Deborah Pryce (born 1951), United States, Ohio congresswoman
Guto Pryce (born 1972), Welsh bass guitarist for Super Furry Animals
Sir John Pryce, 1st Baronet (c. 1596 – c. 1657), Welsh parliamentarian
Jonathan Pryce (born 1947), Welsh actor
Karl Pryce (born 1986), English rugby player
Kelly Pryce, stand-up comedian
Leon Pryce English rugby player (older brother to Karl)
Malcolm Pryce (born 1960), British novelist
Richard Pryce 1864-1942, English novelist
Thomas Tannatt Pryce, British captain, World War I
Tom Pryce (1949–1977), British Formula One racing driver
Vicky Pryce, Greek-born British economist
William Thornton Pryce (1932–2006), United States diplomat

In fiction:
Pryce (Pokémon), Pokémon character
Wesley Wyndam-Pryce, fictional character for the American television programs, Buffy the Vampire Slayer and Angel
Arihnda Pryce, an Imperial governor in the animated television series Star Wars Rebels and the novel Star Wars: Thrawn